Christopher Whitcomb is an American author and former member of the FBI's Hostage Rescue Team. He also appeared as an "expert" on the NBC game show Identity.

History with the FBI
Whitcomb spent 15 years with the FBI, and worked on many high-profile cases. These included the Waco Siege, LA Riots, and Ruby Ridge. His final assignment with the FBI consisted of working with the Critical Incident Response Group.

Bibliography
 Cold Zero: Inside the Hostage Rescue Team (2001) - 
 Black: A novel (2005) - 
 White: A novel (2006) -

External links
 Interview on Bookreporter.com

Year of birth missing (living people)
Living people
21st-century American novelists
American male novelists
21st-century American male writers
21st-century American non-fiction writers
American male non-fiction writers